Bernadette Bensaude-Vincent (born 7 July 1949) is a French philosopher, historian and historian of science and a professor emeritus at University of Paris 1 Pantheon-Sorbonne.  She considers the study of the history of science to be essential for "understanding scientific research as a multi-dimensional endeavor embedded in a cultural context and with societal and cultural impacts."

Bensaude-Vincent has published more than a dozen books and 80 articles and essays.  She focuses particularly on the histories of chemistry and materials science. In 1993 she published Histoire de la chimie with Isabelle Stengers, for which they received the Prix Jean-Rostand. It was translated as A History of Chemistry in 1996. In 1997, she received the Dexter Award for her work on the history of science. Her address, on receiving the award, was entitled "A Language to Order the Chaos".

Education
Bensaude-Vincent was born in Béziers on 7 July 1949. She studied at the École normale supérieure de Fontenay-aux-Roses from 1968 to 1971. She earned a degree in philosophy in 1970, an Associate of Philosophy degree  (Agrégation de philosophie) in 1971 and a Doctorate of Letters and Human Sciences as of 1981 from the University of Paris 1 Pantheon-Sorbonne.

Research
Bernadette Bensaude-Vincent studies the philosophy and history of  chemistry and of materials science. She examines patterns of communication and the ways in which scientific language has been constructed,  the relationships between science and the public, and the impact of science and technology on ethics and society. 
Her work has been praised for both its diversity of themes and its originality and methodological depth.

Bensaude-Vincent is particularly concerned with emerging technologies such as nanotechnologies and synthetic biology and with the philosophy of technoscience,
She writes about positivism and the tradition of French epistemology.  She has paid particular attention to Paul Langevin and Emile Meyerson.

Career
Bernadette Bensaude-Vincent worked as a teacher of philosophy from 1972–1982, 
at the Cité des Sciences et de l'Industrie (CSI) from 1982–1986, 
and as an assistant professor at Université Paris X, France (now Paris Nanterre University) from 1989–1994.  In 1993 she published Histoire de la chimie with Isabelle Stengers, which was translated into English as A History of Chemistry in 1997. Bensaude-Vincent and Stengers received the Prix Jean-Rostand for this work.

In the early 1990s, Bensaude-Vincent directed a research program on science and the public, supported by the Center for Research in the History of Science at the Cité des Sciences et de l'Industrie (CSI), working with Anne Rasmussen. This resulted in the publication of La science populaire dans la presse et l'édition : XIXe et XX (1997) edited by Bensaude-Vincent and Rasmussen.

From 1993 to 1997, Bensaude-Vincent led a team within the framework of the European Program on "The Evolution of Chemistry (1789-1939)" of the European Science Foundation. From 1995-1997, she was a researcher at the Centre National de la Recherche Scientifique (CNRS) of the Centre d'Histoire des Sciences et des Techniques, Paris. Her work with the European Science Foundation resulted in the publication of "a particularly productive comparative analysis" of scientific education and the development of chemistry textbooks in European countries in the late 18th and 19th centuries, Communicating chemistry : textbooks and their audiences, 1789-1939 (2000).

In 1997, Bensaude-Vincent became a Professor of History and Philosophy of Science and the Chair of the Department of Philosophy at Université Paris-X Nanterre. She remained there until 2010. 
In 1999 she became Chair of the doctoral program in History of Philosophy, and History and Philosophy of Science.

From 2000 to 2003, Bensaude-Vincent led the Materials Research sub-project, part of the History of Recent Science and Technology (HRST) project at the Dibner Institute for the History of Science and Technology at MIT.

From 2005 to 2008, Bensaude-Vincent coordinated a research program on "Nanobioethics", the ethics of nanobiotechnology, for France's Agence nationale de la recherche (ANR). This work examined the epistemology and ethics of nanotechnology, cloning and bioinformatics. In the resulting book, Les vertiges de la technoscience. Façonner le monde atome par atome (2009), she suggests that technoscience is a new model, requiring re-examination of our concepts of scientific discovery. She calls for a new alliance between science and ethics.

Beginning in 2009, Bensaude-Vincent co-directed a joint ANR/DFG project on the "Genesis and Ontology of Technoscientific Objects" (GOTO), working with Sacha Loeve in France and Astrid Schwarz and Alfred Nordmann in Germany. The project sought to distinguish between science and technoscience, and resulted in the edited work Research Objects in their Technological Setting (2017).

From 2010 to 2015, Bensaude-Vincent was a professor at the University of Paris 1 Pantheon-Sorbonne and the director of The Center for Study of Technology, Knowledge & Practice (Centre d'étude des techniques, des connaissances et des pratiques, CETCOPRA).

In addition she has been a visiting professor at
the Universidad Autonoma de Madrid (1994), 
the University of Bielefeld (1996)
the University of Vienna (1997, 1999), 
the University of Geneva (1998),
the Pontifical Catholic University of São Paulo (2003),
the Universidad de Valencia (2004),
the Universitat Autonoma de Barcelona (2008),
and a visiting scholar at Max Planck Institute for the History of Science in Berlin (2001).

Through her involvement with Fundação para a Ciência e Tecnologia and with Science and Technology in the European Periphery (STEP), she has helped to develop a community of historians of science in Portugal.

Bensaude-Vincent chaired section 72 of the Conseil national des universités (CNU, National Council of Universities), France.
She is a member of the French Academy of Technologies (Académie des technologies), and a senior member of the Institut universitaire de France.
She served as the Vice President for professional and disciplinary history, on the Commission on the History of Modern Chemistry (CHMC) of the International Union of History and Philosophy of Science. She has served on the Ethics Committee of the Centre National de la Recherche Scientifique (CNRS) and The INRAE-CIRAD-IFREMER-IRD Joint Ethics Committee.

Partial bibliography
 Paul Langevin. Science et vigilance (Belin, 1987)
 Lavoisier, Memoires d'une Revolution (Lavoisier, memories of a revolution) (Flammarion, 1993)
 Dans le laboratoire de Lavoisier, (Nathan, Monde en Poche, Paris, 1993)
 Histoire de la chimie (1993) with Isabelle Stengers translated as A History of Chemistry by Deborah van Dam. Cambridge, MA; London, England: Harvard University Press, 1996.
 Eloge du Mixte. Matériaux Nouveaux et Philosophie Ancienne (The Clock of the mixed. New materials and old philosophy) (Hachette Littérature, 1998)
 L'opinion publique et la science. A chacun son ignorance. (Synthélabo, Paris, 2000)
 Science et Opinion. Histoire d'un Divorce (2003)
 Se libérer de la matière. Fantasmes autour des nouvelles technologies (2004)
  Faut-il Avoir Peur de la Chimie? (2005)

Awards and honors 
 1993, with Isabelle Stengers, for Histoire de la chimie,  from the Association of Science Writers of France (l'Association des Ecrivains scientifiques de France)
 1997, Dexter Award for Outstanding Achievements in the History of Chemistry,  American Chemical Society
 2000, Senior Fellowship, Dibner Institute for the History of Science and Technology, MIT
 2018, Doctorate honoris causa from the University of Lisbon
 2021, George Sarton Medal

References

1949 births
Historians of science
Science writers
French women philosophers
Living people
Philosophers of technology